Poruwadanda West Grama Niladhari Division is a Grama Niladhari Division of the Ingiriya Divisional Secretariat  of Kalutara District  of Western Province, Sri Lanka .  It has Grama Niladhari Division Code 618C.

Poruwadanda West is a surrounded by the Poruwadanda East, Wagawatta, Ilimba, Gurugoda and Rathmalgoda West  Grama Niladhari Divisions.

Demographics

Ethnicity 

The Poruwadanda West Grama Niladhari Division has a Sinhalese majority (70.6%) and a significant Indian Tamil population (21.6%) . In comparison, the Ingiriya Divisional Secretariat (which contains the Poruwadanda West Grama Niladhari Division) has a Sinhalese majority (89.8%)

Religion 

The Poruwadanda West Grama Niladhari Division has a Buddhist majority (70.4%) and a significant Hindu population (23.4%) . In comparison, the Ingiriya Divisional Secretariat (which contains the Poruwadanda West Grama Niladhari Division) has a Buddhist majority (89.4%)

Grama Niladhari Divisions of Ingiriya Divisional Secretariat

References